The 2022 Production Alliance Group 300 was the second stock car race of the 2022 NASCAR Xfinity Series and the 23rd iteration of the event. The race was held on Saturday, February 26, 2022, in Fontana, California at Auto Club Speedway, a 2-mile (3.22 km) permanent oval-shaped speedway. The race was run over 165 laps due to three overtime finishes. Cole Custer of SS-Green Light Racing would win the race after leading the most laps. This was Cole's tenth career win in the Xfinity Series, his first of the season, and the first career win for SS-Green Light Racing. To fill out the podium, Noah Gragson of JR Motorsports and Trevor Bayne of Joe Gibbs Racing would finish second and third, respectively.

Background 
Auto Club Speedway (formerly California Speedway) is a 2 miles (3.2 km), low-banked, D-shaped oval superspeedway in Fontana, California which has hosted NASCAR racing annually since 1997. It is also used for open wheel racing events. The racetrack is located near the former locations of Ontario Motor Speedway and Riverside International Raceway. The track is owned and operated by International Speedway Corporation and is the only track owned by ISC to have naming rights sold. The speedway is served by the nearby Interstate 10 and Interstate 15 freeways as well as a Metrolink station located behind the backstretch.

Entry list 

 *Driver changed to Joe Graf Jr. for the race after Graf failed to qualify.

 **Withdrew prior to the event

Practice 
The only 30-minute practice session was held on Saturday, February 26, at 9:00 AM PST.

Qualifying 
Qualifying was held on Saturday, February 26, at 9:30 AM PST. Since Auto Club Speedway is an oval track, the qualifying system used is a single-car, single-lap system with only one round. Whoever sets the fastest time in the round wins the pole.

Race results 
Stage 1 Laps: 35

Stage 2 Laps: 35

Stage 3 Laps: 80*

 *Race extended to 165 laps due to three overtime finishes.

Standings after the race

Drivers' Championship standings

Note: Only the first 12 positions are included for the driver standings.

References 

2022 NASCAR Xfinity Series
NASCAR races at Auto Club Speedway
Production Alliance Group 300
Production Alliance Group 300